Several political parties operate in Sardinia. No party has ever had the chance of gaining power alone and thus parties must work with each other to form coalition governments. The political parties are currently organized mainly in two political coalitions at the regional level: once centred on the Sardinian Action Party and Lega Sardegna, the other around Democratic Party. Because of their ideological and political factionalism, the Sardinian nationalist parties have played a marginal role in the electoral scene.

Parties

Major parties
More than 10% in the 2019 regional election (or at least 10 regional councillors):
Democratic Party (Partito Democratico)
League Sardegna (Lega Sardegna)

Medium parties
Between 4% and 15% in the 2014 regional election (or at least 5 regional councillors):
Sardinian Action Party (Partidu Sardu - Partito Sardo d'Azione)
Forward Italy (Forza Italia)
Five Star Movement (Movimento Cinque Stelle)
Sardinian Reformers (Riformatori Sardi)
Brothers of Italy (Fratelli d'Italia)
Sardinia 20Twenty (Sardegna 20Venti)

Minor parties
Between 1% and 4% in the 2014 regional election (or at least 1 regional councillor):
Free and Equal (Liberi e Uguali)
Article One (Articolo Uno)
Italian Left (Sinistra Italiana)
Union of the Centre (Unione di Centro)
Party of Sardinians (Partito dei Sardi)
Progressive Camp (Campo Progressista)
Civic Movement of Sardinia (Movimento Civico della Sardegna)
We, Sardinia (Noi, Sardegna)
Common Future (Futuro Comune)
Italy in Common (Italia in Comune)
Project Republic of Sardinia (Progetu Repùblica de Sardigna)
United (Unidos)
Red Moors (Rosso Mori)
Independence Republic of Sardinia (Indipendèntzia Repùbrica de Sardigna)
Sardinia Nation Independence (Sardigna Natzione Indipendentzia)
Forward Together (Fortza Paris)
Sardinian Democratic Union (Unione Democratica Sarda)
Christian Popular Union (Unione Popolare Cristiana)
Italian Socialist Party (Partito Socialista Italiano)

Other regional parties
The Base (La Base Sardegna)

Former regional parties
At least 1% in a regional, general or EP election in Sardinia (or at least 2 regional councillors):
Sardinian Socialist Action Party (Partito Sardo d'Azione Socialista)
Independentist Sardinian Party (Partidu Sardu Indipendentista)
New Movement (Nuovo Movimento)
Sardinian People's Party (Partito del Popolo Sardo)
Democratic Federation (Federazione Democratica)
Sardinia Project (Progetto Sardegna)
Sardinian Autonomist Populars (Popolari Autonomisti Sardi)
Sardinia Tomorrow (Sardegna Domani)
A Manca pro s'Indipendèntzia (A Manca pro s'Indipendentzia)
United Independentist Front (Fronte Indipendentista Unidu)
Sardinia Free Zone Movement (Movimento Sardegna Zona Franca)
Sardinian Independentist Party (Partidu Indipendentista Sardu)
Free Sardinia (Sardigna Libera)
Sovereignty (Soberania)

References

See also
Sardinian nationalism
List of political parties in Italy

 
Sardinia